Kim Ji-yeon (Hangul: 김지연;  or  ; born 12 March 1988) is a South Korean left-handed sabre fencer.

Kim is a five-time team Asian champion and four-time individual Asian champion.  

A three-time Olympian, Kim is a 2021 team Olympic bronze medalist and 2012 individual Olympic champion. 

Kim is the first South Korean woman to win an Olympic gold medal in fencing and the second South Korean to win any Olympic medal in fencing after Nam Hyun-hee's silver medal in individual women's foil at the 2008 Beijing Olympic Games. She is also the second South Korean fencer to win an individual gold medal at the Olympic Games, after Kim Young-ho's gold medal in individual men's foil at the 2000 Sydney Olympic Games.

Biography
Kim began fencing at age 13 as a foil fencer, but converted to sabre in high school at age 16 in 2004.

Although she first became a member of the South Korean national fencing team at the age of 18 in 2006, Kim was often overshadowed by fellow sabre fencers Kim Hye-lim, Lee Shin-mi and Kim Keum-hwa, omitted from the final national squad before becoming a fixture in the 2011 season.

Kim began to garner international attention at the 2011 Summer Universiade where she won the bronze medal in the women's individual sabre fencing. In the semifinals, Kim lost to two-time European champion and eventual gold medalist Olha Kharlan of Ukraine 15-10. She accumulated another bronze medal in the women's team sabre as a member of Team South Korea. Kim finished the 2011 season as her first full-time member of the national team, and her FIE ranking rose from 174 to 11.

In February 2012, Kim reached the semifinals at the Orléans Grand Prix, her first international tournament of the 2012 season. Next month, Kim reached her first individual sabre final at the Antalya World Cup in Turkey.
In May 2012, Kim became a semi-finalist at the Bologna World Cup in Italy and the Tianjin Grand Prix in China in a row. Her success in these tournaments increased her FIE ranking to 5th before the start of the 2012 Olympics.

2012 Olympics
Kim competed at the 2012 Summer Olympics in London capturing the gold medal in the women's individual sabre event. This was South Korea's second Olympic gold medal in fencing, Kim Young-ho having won the men's foil Gold medal at the 2000 Summer Olympics.

Kim reached the final when she defeated two-time Olympic individual sabre champion Mariel Zagunis 15–13 in the semifinal match. Largely regarded as the underdog by both competitors and her teammates, she came back from a 12–5 deficit against Zagunis to advance into the finals.

Kim beat Russia's Sofya Velikaya, the reigning world champion, 15–9 in the gold medal match. Kim asserted her dominance early in the contest, with her opponent having little say in the outcome of the first period with an 8–5 triumph for Kim. Velikaya struggled to recover from the setback and the second period followed in much the same way as the first as Kim won 7–4 to win the gold medal.

Medal Record

Olympic Games

World Championship

Asian Championship

Grand Prix

World Cup

References

External links

Kim Ji-yeon at BBC Sport
Kim Ji-yeon at NBC Olympics

1988 births
Living people
Sportspeople from Busan
South Korean female fencers
South Korean sabre fencers
Fencers at the 2012 Summer Olympics
Fencers at the 2016 Summer Olympics
Fencers at the 2020 Summer Olympics
Olympic fencers of South Korea
Olympic gold medalists for South Korea
Olympic bronze medalists for South Korea
Olympic medalists in fencing
Medalists at the 2012 Summer Olympics
Medalists at the 2020 Summer Olympics
Fencers at the 2014 Asian Games
Fencers at the 2018 Asian Games
Asian Games gold medalists for South Korea
Asian Games silver medalists for South Korea
Asian Games bronze medalists for South Korea
Asian Games medalists in fencing
Medalists at the 2014 Asian Games
Medalists at the 2018 Asian Games
Universiade medalists in fencing
Universiade gold medalists for South Korea
Universiade silver medalists for South Korea
Universiade bronze medalists for South Korea
South Korean Buddhists
Medalists at the 2011 Summer Universiade
Medalists at the 2013 Summer Universiade
Left-handed fencers
21st-century South Korean women